The Dundee Limestone is a geologic formation in Michigan, Ohio and Ontario. It preserves fossils dating back to the Devonian period.

See also

 List of fossiliferous stratigraphic units in Ohio

References
 

Devonian Ohio
Devonian southern paleotemperate deposits
Devonian southern paleotropical deposits
Middle Devonian Series